The following radio stations broadcast on FM frequency 96.8 MHz:

Africa
GABz Fm In Botswana

Cyprus
Radio Sfera at Nicosia

Greece
Rythmos FM at Drama, Macedonia
Minore Kallonis 96.8 at Kalloni, Lesvos Prefecture
Velvet 96.8 at Thessaloniki
ERA 3 in Pilio; Volos

Latvia
EHR SuperHits in Riga

Nepal
Radio Lumbini at Lumbini

New Zealand
George FM at Queenstown

Singapore
Oli 96.8FM

Spain
Radio Brian - Gran Canaria

Zanzibar
Zenji FM

North Macedonia
Radio Fortuna at Skopje

References

Lists of radio stations by frequency